The 1989 civil unrest in Moldavia began on November 7, 1989, in Chișinău (then known as "Kishinev"), Moldavia and continued on November 10, when protesters burned down the headquarters of the Ministry of Internal Affairs (led by Vladimir Voronin). Festivals on 7 November 1989 commemorating the October Revolution and 10 November celebrating the Soviet police force offered excellent opportunities for oppositionists to challenge authorities in highly visible settings and disrupt events of premiere importance to the Soviet regime. During the former event, protesters interrupted a military parade involving troops of the Chișinău Garrison on Victory Square (now Great National Assembly Square), which forced the military to cancel the mobile column planned that day.

Popular Front of Moldova activists, often going beyond the official sanction of the movement leadership, organized actions that embarrassed the republican leadership, ultimately resulted in riots in central Chișinău. This unrest sealed the fate of the increasingly weak First Secretary of the Communist Party of Moldavia. At the Politburo meeting of the CPM Central Committee of 9 November, the first secretary of the party, Simon Grossu urged militia to proceed to prosecute and arrest those responsible for the events of November 7. Moreover, he proposed that those arrested to be deported outside Moldavia. On November 10, protesters burned down the headquarters of the Ministry of Internal Affairs. On November 10, the minister of Internal Affairs Vladimir Voronin was hiding in the building of the Central Committee of the Communist Party, while defending the Ministry of Internal Affairs was entrusted to General Zhukov.

At the end of a year that had seen Semion Grossu and his organization pummeled from both the national revivalist right and the "ultrarevolutionary" internationalist left, Moscow replaced the First Secretary with Petru Lucinschi in a snap Central Committee plenum on November 16, 1989.

References

External links
 Igor Cașu, Radio Free Europe, Chișinău 7 noiembrie 1989: "Jos dictatura comunistă!" 
 7 aprilie 2009 ne amintește de 10 noiembrie 1989 
 Literatura şi Arta, 16 noiembrie 1989: izbînda gorbaciovismului în Republica Socialistă Sovietică Moldovenească
 7 noiembrie 1989

1989 in the Moldavian Soviet Socialist Republic
Political violence in Moldova
Anti-communism in Moldova
Riots and civil disorder in Moldova 
Protest marches
Moldavian Soviet Socialist Republic
History of Chișinău
Eastern Bloc
Riots and civil disorder in the Soviet Union
1989 in the Soviet Union
Conflicts in 1989
Protests in the Soviet Union
Protests in Moldova